Gustaf Isidor Mattsson (8 September 1893 – 15 January 1977) was a Swedish long-distance runner. He competed at the 1920 Summer Olympics in the 3,000 m steeplechase and 8,000 m cross-country events and finished in fourth and tenth place, respectively. His tenth place earned him a bronze medal with the Swedish team.

Mattsson competed over distances ranging from 3,000 m to marathon and won three Swedish titles over 20 km on the road. He was a businessman by trade.

References

1893 births
1977 deaths
Swedish male long-distance runners
Swedish male steeplechase runners
Olympic athletes of Sweden
Olympic bronze medalists for Sweden
Athletes (track and field) at the 1920 Summer Olympics
Medalists at the 1920 Summer Olympics
Olympic bronze medalists in athletics (track and field)
Olympic cross country runners